Structurally Bihar is divided into divisions (Pramandal - प्रमंडल)), districts (Zila), sub-divisions (Anumandal) & circles (Anchal). The state is divided into 9 divisions, 38 districts, 101 subdivisions and 534 circles. 12 municipal corporations, 49 Nagar Parishads and 80 Nagar Panchayats for administrative purposes.

Divisions 

Note :

* Population data obtained from the sum of the populations of the districts.

Summary

See also 

India 
Bihar
Government of Bihar
Administration in Bihar
Cities in Bihar 
Districts of Bihar
Divisions of India
Subdivisions of Bihar
Blocks in Bihar
Villages in Bihar

References